Garden waste, or green waste dumping is the act of discarding or depositing garden waste somewhere it does not belong.    
 
Garden waste is the accumulated plant matter from gardening activities which involve cutting or removing vegetation, i.e. cutting the lawn, weed removal, hedge trimming or pruning consisting of lawn clippings. leaf matter, wood and soil.

The composition and volume of garden waste can vary from season to season and location to location. A study in Aarhus, Denmark, found that on average, garden waste generation per person ranged between 122 kg to 155 kg per year.

Garden waste may be used to create compost or mulch, which can be used as a soil conditioner, adding valuable nutrients and building humus. The creation of compost requires a balance between, nitrogen, carbon, moisture and oxygen. Without the ideal balance, plant matter may take a long time to break down, drawing nitrogen from other sources, reducing nitrogen availability to existing vegetation which requires it for growth.

The risk of dumping garden waste is that it may contain seeds and plant parts that may grow (propagules), as well as increase fire fuel loads, disrupt visual amenity, accrue economic costs associated with the removal of waste as well as costs associated with the mitigation of associated impacts such as weed control, forest fire.

Cause
There are strong links between weed invasion of natural areas and the proximity and density of housing. The size and duration of the community have a direct relation to the density of weed infestation. Of the various means in which migration of exotic species from gardens take place, such as vegetative dispersal of runners, wind born and fallen seed, garden waste dumping can play a significant role. The results of one North German study found that of the problematic population of Fallopia, app. 29% originated from garden waste. Of a population of Heracleum mantegazzianum, 18% was found by Schepker to be generated by garden waste (as cited by Kowarik & von der Lippe, 2008) pg 24–25.

An Australia government publication suggest that some of the main reasons for the dumping of garden waste can be attributed to lack of care for the environment, convenience, or a reluctance to pay for the correct collection or disposal of the waste. (Environmental Protection Agency [EPA]. 2013). People dump garden waste to avoid disposal fees at landfill sites or because they do not want to spend the time or effort disposing of or recycling their waste properly. This activity is carried out by people in all parts of the community, from householders to businesses, such as professional landscapers and gardeners.
The spread of exotic vegetation can out-compete locally endemic vegetation, altering the composition and structure of an ecosystem.

Dumping of garden waste in particular facilitates the spread of exotic vegetation into forest remnants via the introduction of seeds and propagules contained within the garden waste. Common selection criteria for home gardeners when choosing plants are often based on ease of propagation, suitability to local environmental conditions and novelty. These specific chosen characteristics increase the chance of plant parts and seeds that are introduced into forested areas becoming a problem.

The three major causes of animal habitat degradation are; the disruption or loss of ecosystem functions, the loss of food resources and loss of resident species. Non-native invaders can cause extinctions of vulnerable native species through competition, pest and disease transportation and habitat and ecosystem alteration.
 
The dumping of garden waste in nature reserves surrounding and near urban areas increases the risk of fires. The dumped garden waste will eventually dry out creating fuel adding to already fallen debris fuel load on which a fire can thrive and spread on. Garden waste can spread weeds and these weeds build fuel for fires.  Dumped garden waste can facilitate higher rates of erosion by smothering natural vegetation cover.  With no root systems for stabilisation the top soil is vulnerable to erosion (Ritter, J. 2015), This can add higher  levels of sediments, contributing to the siltation of creeks and waterways.

If plant matter gets into waterways it can create reduced oxygen levels through the process of decomposition of green waste such as lawn clippings. This directly upsets the quality of water, affecting fish and aquatic wildlife.
This dumping of green waste can also lead to the blocking of drainage systems; directly through the build-up of plant debris, and indirectly through the spread of invasive plant species that colonise wet areas, reducing and or changing the flow of waterways. This change in flow, including path and velocity, can alter hydrological cycles, affecting frequency and intensity of floods.

Impact
Green and garden waste has a direct impact to the visual aesthetics of land and can often attract further illegal dumping.

Increased fire risk
Dumping garden waste in nature reserves and parks surrounding and near urban areas can directly and indirectly affect the existing flora and fauna, as well as human life through the  increased risk of fires.  The dumped garden waste will eventually dry, creating additional  fuel, adding to already fallen debris on which a fire can thrive and spread. Garden waste can spread weeds and these weeds also build fuel for fires. Fires may also spread to the suburban areas where humans can also be impacted by losing their homes from fire, incur injury or death from smoke or burns, and suffer economic loses such as income loss and clean-up costs. Fires can lead to an overall loss of habitat and biodiversity.

Threat to biodiversity
The invasion of exotic plant species into remnant native forests is a threat to biodiversity. Some impacts of habitat degradation include; when native animals, insects and birds become vulnerable and put at risk; loss of food source for native wildlife; disruption of native plant-animal relationships ie pollination and seed dispersal and disconnection of plant-host relationships. Highly adaptive plants chosen for their ease of cultivation out compete more specialised species. 
Weed invasion of a forest system can change the processes of plant succession (the system of one species replacing another due to disturbance factors), the composition of the plant community and the composition and availability of nutrients. The change in forest composition can lead to loss of unique plant species.
When a habitat is destroyed, the plants, animals, and other organisms that occupied the habitat have a reduced carrying capacity so that populations decline and extinction becomes a threat. Many endemic organisms have very specific requirements for their survival that can only be found within a certain ecosystem. The term 'hotspot' is used to describe areas featuring exceptional concentrations of endemic species and facing high potential of habitat degradation. The 25 most significant hotspots contain the habitats of 133,149 plant species (44% of all plant species worldwide; table 1) and 9,645 vertebrate species (35% of all vertebrate worldwide; table 2). These endemics are confined to an expanse of 2.1 million square kilometers (1.4% of land surface). Having lost 88% of their primary vegetation, they formerly occupied 17.4 million square kilometers or 11.8% of land surface.
The recruitment of alien invasive species may lead to a homogenisation of landscapes. Although increased bio diversity in subregions created by newly introduced species may occur, the displacement of the existing plant species may lead to reduced biodiversity on a global scale.

When population-level properties that indicate superior competitive ability of the invading species are examined, 13–24 (42–77%) of the species are included, with the majority of species showing traits capable of modifying natural systems at both ecosystem and community/population scales.

Waterways quality
The dumping of green waste such as lawn clippings can block drainage systems which pollutes water therefore effecting water quality and the health of aquatic plants and animals. Dumped garden waste can add high levels of sediments, reducing the light available for photosynthesis.  Dumping also block waterways and roads, cause flooding and facilitate higher rates of erosion by smothering natural vegetation cover.

Causes / stakeholders
Illegal dumping is carried out by all types of people in all parts of the community, from householders to businesses and other organizations. Addressing these motivations will enable strategies to be developed that deal with the root causes, rather than the results, of illegal dumping.

Some of the main reasons for this careless disregard for waste can be put down to sheer convenience, lack of care for the environment and also a reluctance to pay for the correct collection or disposal of the waste. The monitoring of illegally dumped garden waste by the community and industries will drive effectual tactics to battle illegal depositing. People dump waste illegally to avoid disposal fees at landfill sites or because they do not want to spend the time or effort disposing of or recycling their waste properly. Alligator weed (Alternanthera philoxeroides (Mart.) Griseb.) is an introduced weed originating from Sri Lanka and is creating major issues throughout the Australia since its introduction into the country. Alligator weed has the potential to affect aquatic and terrestrial biodiversity severely and to cause considerable social and economic costs, particularly in aquatic situations.

Mitigation
Education on the value of biodiversity and the negative effects of weed invasion have been identified as key items in changing current trends. Specific education campaigns on the risks of dumping garden waste could be targeted at high-risk societal groups such as residents of housing in close proximity to reserves as well as members of gardening communities and plant sellers. 
Restricting the selection of garden species in new housing developments adjacent to reserves may reduce the effects of illegal dumping, thereby reducing requirement and associated cost of weed management. Creating habitat for wildlife by planting native plants, making a water source available, provide shelter and places to raise young. Healthy ecosystems are necessary for the survival and health of all organisms, and there are a number of ways to reduce negative impact on the environment. Cultivation of native plant species may benefit not only native plant populations but also native animal populations. For example, Sears & Anderson suggest that native bird species diversity in Australia and North America tend to match the volume and diversity of native vegetation. Crisp also explains the percentage of native insect species in a fauna has been found to be consistent with the percentage of native plant species.

Composting is a great way to recycle nutrients back into soils. Mulching the garden with leaves and clippings (BMCC, n.d). 
Fostering an appreciation of local natural environmental features and plant species may also help mitigate the issue. as well as the restriction of highly invasive plant species through international policy.
 
Utilization of green waste bins that are provided by some councils or shires that are emptied via curbside collection (BMCC. n.d). The addition of facilities for waste disposal could also improve the issue (DECC. 2008).  Mitigation may involve governments holding campaigns that show people disposing legally and reporting the consequences for disposing illegally. A way Australian governments are addressing the problem is through the increase of fines in conjunction with better law enforcement.  In Australia, fines can be up to $1,000,000 and can also incur imprisonment. The Protection of the Environment Operations Act imposes penalties for offences including polluting waters with waste, polluting land, illegally dumping waste or using land as an illegal waste facility.

Australia
The new section of the POEO Act (The Protection of the Environment Operations Act 1997) now imposes further penalties for offences including polluting waters with waste, polluting land, illegally dumping waste or using land as an illegal waste facility (Parrino, Maysaa, Kaoutarani & Salam, 2014). Communities are encouraged to report illegal dumping. In accordance with NSW Illegal Dumping Strategy 2014–16, hefty fines and a maximum jail sentence of 2 years can be handed down to repeat offenders.

References

Biodegradable waste management
Gardening
Biological contamination
Litter